Duke (born Mark Carson Adams) is an English singer, songwriter and producer.

Biography 
He had two Top 10 hits on the Billboard Hot Dance Music/Club Play chart: his deep house version of "So in Love with You", which was his biggest hit, reaching No. 1 in 1997, and his follow-up "Greater," which peaked at No. 9 in 1998.

Early life 
He was born in Newcastle upon Tyne, England.

Discography

Albums
The Ten Commandments of Love (1995)

Singles and EPs
"So in Love with You" (1994)
"New Beginning" (1994)
"Make Believeland" (1995)
"Womanchild" (1997)
"Greater" (1998)
"Soul Sister Soul Brother" (2002)
"So in Love with You (K-Klass & Triple Dee \ Hoxton Whores \ MiOn)" (2012)

See also
List of number-one dance hits (United States)
List of artists who reached number one on the US Dance chart

References

Year of birth missing (living people)
Living people
English dance musicians
English house musicians
English male singer-songwriters